Kálmán Tisza de Borosjenő (archaic English: Coloman Tisza, or Koloman Tisza; 16 December 1830 – 23 March 1902) was the Hungarian prime minister between 1875 and 1890. He is credited with the formation of a consolidated Magyar government, the foundation of the new Liberal Party (1875) and major economic reforms that would both save and eventually lead to a government with popular support. He is the second longest-serving head of government in Hungarian history.

Political career

At the age of 18, Kálmán Tisza witnessed one of the greatest transformations of the political arena in Hungarian history. Hungary's political system changed from being a feudalistic state into a newly established constitutional monarchy that shared many components with modern-day governments. Legislation such as Public Law III abolished the Royal Chancellery and the Residential Council replacing them with a bicameral parliament (House of Lords and House of Representatives). Democratic principles were established with Public Law V that allowed 6.5% of the population to vote (Janos 85). Also, the union of traditional Magyar lands under Public Law VI and VII created a unified Hungary. These powerful reforms led to a nationalist revolt that culminated in the dethroning of the Habsburg dynasty during the Hungarian Revolution of 1848-49.

With the defeat of the Hungarians during the revolution, many of the reforms were revoked and Hungary was put under military dictatorship under Austrian general Julius Haynau. Though the revolution's suppression ended the parliamentary-style government in Hungary, it did not destroy the seeds that were sown by the initial reforms. During 1859 and 1860—after seeing the Hungarian popular support for the Italians during the Austro-Italian wars—Austria began to try new constitutional experiments in Hungary. During this period, Kálmán Tisza was first elected to the newly formed government. Then, in 1867, on behalf of the Hungarian Parliament, Tisza participated in negotiations with Emperor Franz Joseph I that led to the Compromise of 1867. The importance of this document is that it restored the "Constitutional integrity of Hungary" (Janos 90), with the exception over powers of defense and foreign affairs. These minor concessions by the Emperor soon collated and restored the powers, concerning internal affairs back to the Hungarians. These changed circumstances laid the path for Tisza to rise to the position of Prime Minister. In 1875, he founded the Liberal Party and was elected to the position of Prime Minister of Hungary. The efficiency of the government was initially quite weak and his actions during his 15-year service mainly consisted of reforming the government and the economy.

The newly born government bureaucracy of Hungary was inefficient and lacked a centralized government. One of the first acts performed under the premiership of Kálmán Tisza was the consolidation of power and transformation of the bureaucracy into a single, capable apparatus: "The bureaucracy was in charge of the elections and perpetuating the liberal majority, while parliament and the party would lend an aura of legitimacy to bureaucratic policies and provide a forum to articulate bureaucratic interests" (Janos 97). Kálmán Tisza achieved consolidation of power within the government while Parliament simply served to legitimize those actions. Consolidation of power also consisted of the reform of an incumbent parliament where members came to hold their seats regularly without challenge.

Reform of the House of Magnates in Hungary
469 members were removed under the provisions of the Parliament Act. The number of Members set to 369 members: 205 hereditary peers, 83 church dignitaries, and a new feature, 81 life members. Aristocratic titles were still given by the imperial power but hereditary and life peerages were to be awarded upon the advice of the Prime Minister who, in case of emergency, could seek the appointment of new members to secure the passage of a particular piece of legislation (Janos 99). These reforms allowed the position of the Prime Minister to be the single most important actor in the Hungarian political arena. These reforms by Tisza allowed him to consolidate power within the Hungarian government and also remove much of the influence extended by the Austrians. He helped to finally set in stone the shift of Hungarian political dependence away from the Austrians.

Economic reform
Between 1869 and 1875 (with the establishment of the new Hungarian political system), the Hungarians chose to style their economic system under a French model. The problem they encountered was that their current political system was more advanced in comparison to their archaic economic system. For example, taxation of the people came in the form of quasi-military campaigns that only raised taxes by 11% (Janos 106), while it embittered the rural population. Thus, these 6 years were known as a period of poor management of the economy by a failing government. When Tisza came to power in 1875, he consolidated the economy in many ways similar to his power consolidation of the government. He initiated tax reforms saving the state from bankruptcy. In 1889, Sándor Wekerle became Minister of Finance. He collaborated with Tisza to develop a new tax system which focused on taxing the land. The success of these reforms were tremendous, even though the land tax increased by 30%, the revenues of the government increased by 330% (Janos 108). Between 1880 and 1895, public revenue doubled due to the successful tax reforms. Though the Tisza-Wekerle system saved the government from bankruptcy, the tax system proved to be too harsh and eventually prevented the rise of a domestic market for the products produced by Hungary.

Legacy
The contributions made by Kálmán Tisza during his 15-year premiership were quite tremendous. Although he was born during the midst of a failing Austrian Imperial government in Hungary and he had inherited a failing Hungarian Constitutional government, he managed to turn Hungary into a modern state. He saved his country from going completely bankrupt and consolidated and created an efficient centralized government. His legacy of reform and success gave confidence to a people that were once suppressed by the Austrians and were struggling to master constitutional government. However, he has also been associated with the policy of Magyarization and the imposition of Magyar hegemony over the various linguistic and ethnic groups in Hungary, as well as consolidating the influence of the Magyar country gentry on political life. His son István Tisza also became a notable Hungarian politician.

Orders and decorations
   Austria-Hungary: Grand Cross of the Royal Hungarian Order of Saint Stephen, 1880

Ancestors

References

Bibliography
Andrew C. Janos, The Politics of Backwardness in Hungary 1825–1945, Princeton: Princeton University Press, 1982.

External links
 

1830 births
1902 deaths
People from Oradea
Hungarian Calvinist and Reformed Christians
Kalman Tisza
Hungarian nobility
Resolution Party politicians
Left Centre politicians
Liberal Party (Hungary) politicians
Prime Ministers of Hungary
Hungarian Interior Ministers
Foreign ministers of Hungary
Finance ministers of Hungary
Grand Crosses of the Order of Saint Stephen of Hungary